Steve Howey may refer to:

Steve Howey (actor) (born 1977), American actor
Steve Howey (footballer) (born 1971), English footballer